Caufield is an Irish surname, a variation to the name Caulfield. Notable people with the surname include:

Cole Caufield (born 2001), American ice hockey player
Frank J. Caufield (born 1939), American businessman
James Caufield, American photographer
Jay Caufield (born 1960), American ice hockey player
LaNeishea Caufield (born 1980), American basketball player

See also
Caulfield (disambiguation)

Surnames of Irish origin